Green County may refer to:

 Green County, Kentucky 
 Green County, Wisconsin
 Tom Green County, Texas

See also 
Greene County (disambiguation)
Green Country, a tourism designation for Northeast Oklahoma